The Local Democracy and Boundary Commission for Wales is a Welsh Government sponsored body, responsible for defining borders for local elections and government in Wales.

The name of the commission was changed in 2013 from the Local Government Boundary Commission for Wales, as a result of the Local Government (Democracy) (Wales) Act 2013

(

).
Established in 1974, its role is to keep under review all local government areas in Wales, and the electoral arrangements for the principal areas, and to make such proposals to the Welsh Government as seem desirable in the interests of effective and convenient local government.

Electoral arrangements in six authorities were reviewed after the penultimate round of Welsh local elections in 1999, and the changes were implemented at the elections on 10 June 2004.

In 2002, the commission also reviewed and amended some of the boundaries of the preserved counties of Wales.

In February 2009 the Minister for Local government and Social Justice issued Directions to the commission to begin an Electoral Review across all the 22 local authorities in Wales.  His stated aim was to rationalise representation at "... no lower than a ratio of 1 councillor to 1,750 electors "

External links
Local Democracy and Boundary Commission for Wales

References

Welsh Government sponsored bodies
Elections in Wales
Local government in Wales
Boundary commissions in the United Kingdom